For the Broken is the debut album of American Rock band One Step Away.

Track listing

Credits
Adam Carrington - vocals, songwriter, group member
Terence Healy - guitar, backup vocals, songwriter, group member
Mike Nuzzolo - bass, backup vocals, songwriter, group member
Ben Trudeau - drums, backup vocals, songwriter, group member
Dan Malsch - executive producer, mixing, engineer
Alec Henninger - producer, mixing, engineer
Joshua Rittenhouse - art direction

References

2010 debut albums